Downing Vaux (November 14, 1856 – May 15, 1926) was an American landscape architect. Vaux was one of the eleven founding members of the American Society of Landscape Architects (ASLA) in 1899.

Career

Born to Calvert Vaux, a noted architect (1824-1895), and Mary Swan McEntee (1830-1892), Vaux was named after his father's mentor, Andrew Jackson Downing. He had one brother, Calvert Bowyer, and three sisters: Helen, Julia, and Marian. Vaux was an early associate of two other founding members of the ASLA: he attended boarding school in Plymouth, Massachusetts, with John Charles Olmsted, and worked with Samuel Parsons at Calvert's firm in the 1880s. In 1874, Vaux attended the Columbia School of Mines, but dropped out. In the late 1880s, he assisted his father with the design for Riverside Drive in Manhattan and the Wilderstein estate's grounds in Rhinebeck, both in New York.

In 1926, Vaux committed suicide by jumping from the roof of a YMCA building in Kingston, New York. He was buried at Brookside Cemetery in Englewood, New Jersey.

Personal life
Vaux's uncle was Jervis McEntee, a noted painter. In 1881, Vaux was engaged to Edwina Booth, daughter of Edwin Booth, but the marriage was called off. On May 8, 1883, Vaux's father, Calvert, reported his son as missing to Inspector George W. Dilks and the New York Police Department. In 1893, Vaux married Lillian Baker Andrews and they had one daughter, Priscilla, who was born on December 28, 1899, but lived only hours. He was a member of the American Scenic and Historic Preservation Society, the Architectural League of New York, and the National Arts Club.

References

External links
Cultural Landscape Foundation profile

1856 births
1926 deaths
1926 suicides
American people of British descent
Architects from New York City
American landscape architects
Suicides by jumping in New York City
Burials at Brookside Cemetery (Englewood, New Jersey)
Columbia School of Mines alumni